Li Fang may refer to:

Li Fang (Song dynasty) (925–996), Song dynasty scholar-official and editor
Li Fang (tennis) (born 1973), Chinese female tennis player
Li Fang (footballer) (born 1993), Chinese male association footballer
Li Fang (badminton), Chinese gold medalist at the 1978 WBF World Championships
Li Fang (diplomat) (born 1895), Chinese diplomat